The fifth season of Dexter premiered on September 26, 2010, and consisted of 12 episodes. The season focuses on how Dexter comes to terms with the aftermath of the Season 4 finale, helping a girl stop a group of serial rapists, and avoiding a corrupt cop who learns his deadly secret.

Plot 
As the police arrive at Dexter's house, he is obviously in shock and, either because he feels guilty that his relationship with the Trinity Killer, Arthur Mitchell, caused Rita's death or because he is answering a question ("Sir, did you say that you called this in?") asked by one of the police officers, and admits "it was me". Joey Quinn is already suspicious about the circumstances surrounding Rita's death, considering it did not follow Trinity's modus operandi. He is also suspicious of Dexter's unemotional manner after the incident. Astor takes Rita's death particularly hard, and blames Dexter for it. Unable to reconcile, Astor decides that she wants to live with her grandparents in Orlando, Florida, and she and Cody leave Miami.

Miami Metro begins investigating a severed head left in a Venezuelan neighborhood, and also find several related cases. The suspect is quickly nicknamed the Santa Muerte Killer. The FBI, unable to find Arthur Mitchell, follows its only other lead, Kyle Butler (Dexter's alias when interacting with the Mitchell family). Quinn recognizes the similarities between sketches of Kyle Butler and Dexter. Dexter finds a Department of Sanitation worker, Boyd Fowler, who is responsible for the deaths of several women. Dexter hires a nanny named Sonya to care for Harrison.  Dexter eventually kills Fowler, but the crime is witnessed by Fowler's next victim Lumen Pierce whom he has in captivity. 

Dexter tries to care for Lumen, but she is understandably suspicious of his motives, asking Dexter if he is going to "sell her". Quinn tracks down the Mitchells, who are now in witness protection.  He approaches Jonah Mitchell at a small convenience store and shows him a picture of Dexter, asking if it is Kyle Butler, but an undercover FBI agent interrupts before Jonah can answer. Quinn is suspended without pay by LaGuerta for disobeying her orders as she continues to defend Dexter. With Dexter's help, Deb closes in on the Santa Muerte killer. Debra lets him escape during a hostage standoff in order to save the hostage's life. 

Lumen tells Dexter that she was attacked by a group of men, not merely Fowler on his own. Lumen asks Dexter to help her seek revenge on these men, but he initially refuses. After Lumen continues on her own and mistakenly targets the wrong suspect, Dexter teaches her the importance of knowing a person is guilty. Dexter accompanies Lumen to the airport and believes she has left Miami. Instead, Lumen remains behind, hunts down and shoots one of her attackers, and out of desperation asks Dexter to help her clean up the crime scene. Dexter reluctantly agrees, and they finish moments before homicide police locate the crime scene. Lumen later reveals to Dexter that killing one of her attackers brought her a sense of peace. She tearfully recognizes that it will not last and that she will have to find (and kill) the others to experience that peace again. Dexter recognizes this as being her own Dark Passenger. He decides to help her, partly to atone for his earlier inability to save Rita.

Meanwhile, LaGuerta and Angel Batista make their marriage public but are having marital issues, and Quinn and Debra become romantically involved. When Angel gets involved in a bar fight which gets him in trouble with the Internal Affairs Department (IAD), LaGuerta saves him by helping IAD set up a sting on another cop who is under suspicion, Stan Liddy. Liddy develops a friendship with Quinn, their common bond being they were both "betrayed" by LaGuerta, and Quinn pays Liddy to investigate Dexter. Debra remains unaware that Quinn suspects her brother is Kyle Butler.

Dexter and Lumen hunt the other people responsible for torturing her, including their leader, motivational speaker Jordan Chase, and people associated with him. As Quinn's relationship with Deb deepens, he tries to stop Liddy's investigation, but by this point Liddy has taken pictures of Dexter and Lumen on Dexter's boat disposing of large plastic bags and video of them practicing for a kill, and is determined to continue. Having lost his job and convinced Dexter is a criminal, Liddy captures Dexter and calls Quinn to tell him to come to his location. A struggle ensues and Dexter kills Liddy and destroys Liddy's surveillance footage. Dexter learns Lumen has been kidnapped by Jordan Chase and is forced to leave the crime scene to try to find her. Quinn, having responded to a call from Liddy, finds Liddy's van locked and apparently empty; a drop of Liddy's blood falls on his shoe, unnoticed. Dexter returns home to collect his tools to attack Jordan. He is surprised to see Astor and Cody who want to have their baby brother Harrison's first birthday party in Miami and stay with him the coming summer.

Before Dexter can confront Jordan, he is called away to Liddy's crime scene, where the police suspect Quinn's involvement in Liddy's death after noticing the blood drop that fell on his shoe earlier. Quinn initially complies but later refuses to answer questions. Later, Dexter learns of Jordan's (and Lumen's) whereabouts. The two briefly struggle. Dexter overpowers Jordan, and then allows Lumen to kill Jordan. After the kill, Deb discovers the two of them, though they are behind translucent plastic and she is not able to see their identities. Understanding that one of the two figures must be an escaped victim, Deb sympathizes and retreats so they can escape. After Jordan's death, Lumen no longer feels the need to kill and tearfully admits she needs to move on, leaving Dexter distraught.

Quinn talks with Dexter at Harrison's birthday party, where Quinn thanks Dexter for exonerating him, as Dexter has faked a blood test to clear Quinn. Quinn and Deb appear to reconcile, as do Maria and Angel. Blowing out Harrison's birthday candle, Dexter wonders if there is hope for him — to have a genuine relationship, to be human — but he doubts it.

Cast

Main 
 Michael C. Hall as Dexter Morgan
 Jennifer Carpenter as Debra Morgan
 Desmond Harrington as Joey Quinn
 C.S. Lee as Vince Masuka
 Lauren Vélez as María LaGuerta
 David Zayas as Angel Batista
 James Remar as Harry Morgan

Recurring 
 Peter Weller as Stan Liddy
 Maria Doyle Kennedy as Sonya
 April Lee Hernández as Cira Manzon
 Adam John Harrington as Ray Walker
 Christina Robinson as Astor Bennett
 Chris Vance as Cole Harmon
 Steve Eastin as Bill Bennett
 Preston Bailey as Cody Bennett
 Kathleen Noone as Maura Bennett
 Rick Peters as Elliot
 Raphael Sbarge as Jim McCourt
 Geoff Pierson as Tom Matthews
 Tasia Sherel as Francis
 Brando Eaton as Jonah Mitchell

Special guest star 
 Julia Stiles as Lumen Pierce

Guest appearance 
 Julie Benz as Rita Morgan
 Jonny Lee Miller as Jordan Chase
 Katherine Moennig as Michael Angelo

Guest cast 
 Angela Bettis as Emily Birch 
 Shawn Hatosy as Boyd Fowler 
 Sean O'Bryan as Dan Mendell 
 Joseph Julian Soria as Carlos Fuentes 
Josue Aguirre as Marco Fuentes
 Chad Allen as Lance Robinson
Tabitha Morella as Olivia 
 Daniel Travis as Barry Kurt
 Michael Durrell as Stuart Frank
 Scott Grimes as Alex Tilden

Crew 
Fourth season executive producers John Goldwyn, Sara Colleton, Scott Buck and Michael C. Hall all remained in their roles for the fifth season. Past executive producer and show runner Clyde Phillips remained part of the crew as a consultant for the fifth season. Following the conclusion of 24, Manny Coto and Chip Johannessen joined the crew as executive producers. Johannessen served as the show runner for the fifth season. Jim Leonard also joined the crew as a consulting producer.

Fourth season supervising producers Timothy Schlattmann and Wendy West were promoted to co-executive producers for the fifth season. Fourth season producer Lauren Gussis was promoted to supervising producer. Robert Lloyd Lewis returned as the on set producer. Co-producers Gary Law and Chad Tomasoski also retained their roles. Fourth season story editor Scott Reynolds was promoted to executive story editor for the fifth .

Episodes

References

External links 
 
 

 
2010 American television seasons